The men's marathon at the 2002 European Athletics Championships was held on August 11.

Results

See also
 2002 Marathon Year Ranking
 2002 European Marathon Cup

External links
Results

Marathon
Marathons at the European Athletics Championships
2002 marathons
Men's marathons
Marathons in Germany